Where Dead Voices Gather is a book by Nick Tosches. It is, in part, a biography of Emmett Miller, one of the last minstrel singers. Just as importantly, it depicts Tosches' search for information about Miller, about whom he initially wrote in his book Country: The Twisted Roots of Rock and Roll. It is also a study of minstrelsy and its connection to American folk music, country music, the blues and ultimately, rock and roll. In that way, it is a companion volume to his other books of music journalism, Country and Unsung Heroes of Rock N' Roll.

Books about singers
Books by Nick Tosches
2001 non-fiction books